Durbach is a municipality in the district of Ortenau in Baden-Württemberg in Germany. It is situated on the verge of the northern Black Forest Mountains six kilometers north east of the town of Offenburg.

Main branches of commerce are agriculture (especially production of wine) and tourism. It is known for its Riesling wine. The Riesling grape grown in the Ortenau district is known as Klingelberger for the name of a vineyard in Durbach.

History 
Durbach was mentioned first in 1287 as Turbach. In 1973 the community included Ebersweier.

Culture and attractions 
Attractions include the town itself and surrounding vineyards which span the slopes of the mountains.

 Schloss Staufenberg  is a castle, owned by the Markgraf von Baden with views over the Rhine valley and Strassbourg to the Vosges mountains in Alsace.
 Contemporary art museum Hurrle
 The «Skulpturenpark»  is an exhibition of contemporary sculptures in the park of the MediClin Staufenburg Klinik.

Partnership 
Partnership towns are:
  Bürserberg, Vorarlberg, Austria
  Châteaubernard, Nouvelle-Aquitaine, France.

Gallery

Other projects 

  Commons Durbach
 Commons Skulpturenpark Durbach
  Commons Burg Staufenberg

References

External links

External links
  
  Durbach:History and images
 Tourist Information

Ortenaukreis